China National Highway 338 will run from Haixing to Tianjun. It is one of the new trunk highways proposed in the China National Highway Network Planning (2013 - 2030).

Status
Hubei

Shanxi

Shaanxi
Complete between Dianta and Fugu County.
Inner Mongolia
Partially complete in Otog Banner. Under construction in Uxin Banner.
Ningxia
Planning phase between Zhongning and Zhongwei.
Gansu
Completed between Jingtai County and border with Qinghai.
Qinghai
Planning phase in Menyuan County.

References

Transport in Gansu
National Highways in China